The Kalutara Prison Riots occurred on December 12, 1997, at the high-security prison in Kalutara, Sri Lanka. Three minority Tamil political prisoners were killed by  majority Sinhalese prisoners. No one has yet been convicted for these crimes.

See also
Welikada prison massacre
Bindunuwewa prison massacre
Black July
Ethnic problem in Sri Lanka
State terrorism in Sri Lanka

References
Tamil prisoners murdered in custody - December 1997
Massacre in the hills – Sri Lanka monitor article

External links
London Vigil over Kalutara prison massacre
Kalutara prison inquiry concludes

Riots and civil disorder in Sri Lanka
History of Sri Lanka (1948–present)
Sri Lanka and state terrorism
Prison uprisings